The 2017 Bursa Cup was a professional tennis tournament played on outdoor clay courts. It was the third edition of the tournament and was part of the 2017 ITF Women's Circuit. It took place in Bursa, Turkey, on 17–23 July 2017.

Singles main draw entrants

Seeds 

 1 Rankings as of 3 July 2017.

Other entrants 
The following players received a wildcard into the singles main draw:
  Muazzez Demirci
  İpek Öz
  Zeynep Sena Sarıoğlan
  Betina Tokaç

The following player received entry by a protected ranking:
  Anastasia Grymalska

The following players received entry from the qualifying draw:
  Estelle Cascino
  Dia Evtimova
  Daiana Negreanu
  Kyra Shroff

Champions

Singles

 Sofya Zhuk def.  İpek Soylu, 4–6, 6–3, 7–6(7–5)

Doubles
 
 Valentyna Ivakhnenko /  Anastasiya Vasylyeva def.  Dea Herdželaš /  Aleksandra Pospelova, 6–3, 5–7, [10–1]

External links 
 2017 Bursa Cup at ITFtennis.com
 Official website

2017 ITF Women's Circuit
2017 in Turkish tennis
2017